Thiasophila is a genus of beetles belonging to the family Staphylinidae.

The species of this genus are found in Europe and Northern America.

Species:
 Thiasophila angulata (Erichson, 1837) 
 Thiasophila aynumosir Maruyama & Zerche, 2014

References

Staphylinidae
Staphylinidae genera